Galonya is the Hungarian name for two villages in Romania:

 Calina village, Dognecea Commune, Caraş-Severin County
 Gălăoaia village, Răstolița Commune, Mureș County